The Stjarnan men's basketball team, commonly known as Stjarnan, is the men's basketball department of Ungmennafélagið Stjarnan, based in the town of Garðabær, Iceland. It is a subdivision of Ungmennafélagið Stjarnan.

History
Stjarnan's men's basketball team was founded in 1993. It reached the Icelandic top-tier Úrvalsdeild karla in 2001. After losing all its games during the 2001–02 season, the team almost folded. It managed to stay afloat and reached the Úrvalsdeild again in 2007 and advanced to the Úrvalsdeild Finals in 2011 and 2013, losing both times. It won the Icelandic Basketball Cup in 2009, 2013, 2015, 2019 and 2020.

On 14 March 2019, Stjarnan defeated Haukar in the last game of the regular season and finished with the best record in the league, winning the Division championship and a home court advantage through the playoffs.

Stjarnan opened the 2019–20 season with an 89-77 win against reigning champions KR in the annual Icelandic Super Cup behind newly signed Kyle Johnson's 21 points. On 15 February 2020, the team repeated as Cup champions after beating Grindavík in the cup final.

On 27 September 2020, Stjarnan won the Super Cup for the second consecutive season.

Honors
 Icelandic Basketball Cup (6):
2009, 2013, 2015, 2019, 2020, 2022

 Icelandic Super Cup (3):
2009, 2019, 2020 

 Company Cup (1):
2015 

 Division II (1):
1995

Players

Individual awards

Úrvalsdeild Domestic Player of the Year
Justin Shouse – 2012, 2013
Úrvalsdeild Foreign Player of the Year
Justin Shouse – 2010
Úrvalsdeild Domestic All-First Team 
Hlynur Bæringsson – 2017, 2018, 2019
Justin Shouse – 2012, 2013
Ægir Steinarsson – 2019
Úrvalsdeild Defensive Player of the Year 
Hlynur Bæringsson – 2017
Ægir Steinarsson – 2019
Icelandic Cup Finals MVP
Jarrid Frye – 2013
Justin Shouse – 2015
Brandon Rozzell – 2019
Ægir Steinarsson – 2020
David Gabrovšek – 2022

Notable players

Retired numbers

Coaches

Notes

References
Official Website  
Eurobasket men's team profile
KKÍ: Stjarnan – kki.is  

Stjarnan (basketball)